CSC Financial Co., Ltd. trading as China Securities, is a Chinese investment bank and brokerage firm established by CITIC Securities and China Jianyin Investment in 2005 in a 60–40 ratio, as a successor of bankrupted China Securities Co., Ltd. (CSC).

The company registered in Hong Kong as a foreign incorporated company as China Securities Finance Co., Ltd. on 28 July 2016 and CSC Financial Co., Ltd. on 20 October, the latter was used in the IPO of CSC's H share. An unrelated company registered the name China Securities Co., Ltd. in Hong Kong in 2014 in order to prospecting the chance that CSC bought back the name. The unrelated company was filed for struck off for dormant (and would be dissolved) by Hong Kong's Companies Register using the power of Chapter 622 Section 745 2.(b) of Hong Kong Law in September 2016.

History

[old] China Securities Co., Ltd. (1992–2005)

The predecessor of CSC Financial Co., Ltd. was incorporated in 1992 as China Securities Co., Ltd. (CSC). Huaxia Securities established a subsidiary in Hong Kong as China Securities (International) Limited in 1994 (the stake was at first held by Huaxia Securities' chairman Shao Chun and CEO Deng Xi as proxies; China Securities (International) became dormant since 2010).

As at 31 December 2004, state-owned enterprise Beijing State-owned Assets Management Co., Ltd. owned 29.82% stake of Huaxia Securities. However, Hua Xia Bank, was partially owned by Shougang Corporation (a direct subsidiary of State-owned Assets Supervision and Administration Commission (SASAC) of Beijing Municipal Government at that time) for 14.29% and other companies instead.

However, after several scandal which the staff illegally made investment without the consent of their client, Huaxia Securities went bankrupted (as in 2016 the firm was still being liquidated).

[new] China Securities Co., Ltd. (2005–)
A new firm with the same English trading name China Securities but different Chinese name was established by CITIC Securities and China Jianyin Investment in 2005 and receiving the client from the old firm, but did not bear any legal responsibility of the old firm.

In the same year China Jianyin Investment transferred the stake its held to Jianyin Investment's parent company Central Huijin Investment, a subsidiary of the State Council of the People's Republic of China. In 2011 China Securities was reincorporated as a "company limited by shares". In 2016 Century Golden Resources Group sold most of its stake to Shannan Jinyuan (4.92%) and Shanghai Shangyan (2.47%).

In 2007 China Securities acquired the remaining stake of China Futures Co., Ltd. from other shareholders.

On 12 July 2012 China Securities re-established its Hong Kong subsidiary as China Securities (International) Finance Holding. The Hong Kong-based holding company itself also forming several subsidiaries.

According to the company, China Securities was ranked 4th by underwriting 135 companies in National Equities Exchange and Quotations.

In November 2016, China Securities started the global offering for its new H shares that would be floated on the Stock Exchange of Hong Kong. The Price was set at HK$ 6.81. Cornerstone investors subscribed 57.38% of the H shares, which equal to 9.47% total share capital of CSC. The largest H share shareholder was Glasslake Holdings, an indirect wholly owned subsidiary of CITIC Limited, which was the largest shareholder of CITIC Securities.

In 2018, its A shares started to trade in the Shanghai Stock Exchange. The company became a constituent of SSE 50, the blue chip index of that exchange in 2019.

Name
On 20 October 2016 China Securities registered its English name in Hong Kong's Companies Register as CSC Financial Co., Ltd.. Its original English trading name which was used in mainland China, China Securities Co., Ltd., was already registered by others in Hong Kong on 21 May 2014 (but with different Chinese name ), as well as the present of unrelated company China Securities Holdings, a small brokerage firm which used the name since 27 February 2012. Despite both companies were now being dissolved: China Securities Holdings ceased business on 31 December 2012 and the former staff was suspended by the Securities and Futures Commission of Hong Kong due to poor management.

CSC Financial also used China Securities Finance Co., Ltd. as the registered name in Hong Kong from July to October 2016. However, it was in fact the trading name of another financial services company of the mainland China.

The predecessor of CSC Financial, China Securities aka Huaxia Securities, was named after Huaxia.

The new Chinese name of China Securities since 2005, literally CITIC – Jianyin Investment Securities, were in fact came from China International Trust and Investment Corporation (the founder of CITIC Securities) and China Construction Bank (the short name of the bank in pinyin was Jiàn yín; China Jianyin Investment was a spin-off of Construction Bank)

Subsidiaries

 China Capital Management Co., Ltd. (100%)
 China Fund Management Co., Ltd. (55%)
 China Futures Co., Ltd. (100%)
 China Securities (International) Finance Holding Co., Ltd. (100%)

Financial data

Rankings
2015 ranking within mainland China:
 by total assets: 11th
 by net assets: 14th
 by operating income: 10th
 by net profit: 10th
 by return of equity: 15th
 by net revenue of asset management (in group basis): 12th
 by net revenue of investment banking (in group basis): 2nd
 by net revenue of underwriting and sponsorship (in group basis): 3rd
 by numbers of shares underwritten (in group basis): 2nd
 by value of underwritten shares (in group basis): 3rd

See also
 UBS Securities, another company owned by Beijing Municipal People's Government
 China Investment Securities, wholly owned subsidiary of China International Capital Corporation, founded by China Jianyin Investment
 Securities industry in China

References

External links
 
 Official website of China Securities (International) Finance Holding

Financial services companies of China
Investment banks in China
Investment management companies of China
Government-owned companies of China
Companies owned by the provincial government of China
Financial services companies established in 2005
Banks established in 2005
Chinese companies established in 2005
Companies based in Beijing
China Investment Corporation